Meymeh (also Romanized as Meimeh) is a city and capital of Meymeh District, in Shahin Shahr and Meymeh County, Isfahan Province, Iran.  At the 2006 census, its population was 5,733, in 1,790 families.

Located in the vicinity of the arterial road of Tehran-Esfahan, it is now classified by the relevant council as a town.

Geography 
Meymeh is located on a high plain in the western foothills of the Kargas mountains, which separate Meymeh from Natanz to the east. To the west lies a wasteland, at the other end of which is Khvansar County.

Clustered around Meymeh are the town of Vazvan and the villages of Ziadabad, Azan, Vandadeh, and Khosrowabad. To the northeast is Chaqadeh. To the northwest, the outlying village of Muteh stands isolated on a rural road leading to Golpayegan.

Climate
Meymeh has a cold semi-arid climate (Köpper Bsk) with an average temperature of 13.6 °C.

History 
Meymeh's significance has largely derived from its position on the route between Isfahan and Tehran. The earliest evidence of the trade routes passing through Meymeh is the presence of two Seljuk-era rebats in the area. One is in Meymeh itself, near a later Mongol-era mosque. The other, now known as Rebat-e Tork, lies further north on the road to Delijan. Originally built as a military outpost, Rebat-e Tork was later converted into a caravanserai.

Textual sources from this time make no mention of Meymeh, but they do appear to mention the nearby town of Vazvan. The 10th-century writer Ibn Khordadbeh described "Rebāṭ-e Vazz" as the station after Borkhvar on the road from Isfahan to Ray (then the main city in the Tehran area). The name "Vazz" is an apparent reference to Vazvan, indicating that it was originally the main town in the area. Meymeh itself is first mentioned by Yaqut al-Hamawi, several centuries later, who describes Meymeh as a wilayat of Isfahan.

However, Hamdallah Mustawfi, the main authority on Iranian geography in the following 14th century, makes no mention of Meymeh. By the Safavid era, the main trade route from Isfahan to Tehran had shifted away from Meymeh, now passing through the towns of Natanz, Qohrud, and Kashan in the Kargas mountains. This remained the preferred route through the time of the Qajar dynasty. Meymeh's modern importance came after the automobile gained popularity in Iran, replacing the camel caravans of earlier times. The arrival of the automobile caused the preferred route to shift from the mountains to the plains of Meymeh and Delijan.

Meymeh in the 1930s 
The ethnographic writings of Ann Lambton, in 1936–37, provide a snapshot of life in Meymeh and Jowsheqan during the 1930s, when traditional small-town life was just beginning to be affected by the sweeping reforms of Reza Shah Pahlavi. Most people in Meymeh were peasants who owned their own land. The town's agricultural area was divided into 2,016 habbas, with the average holding being 2-5 habbas, although there was one large landowner who owned a large portion of the habbas, along with several thousand sheep and goats. Meymeh also had a carpenter, a blacksmith, a potter, a builder, a brickmaker, a couple of shopkeepers, and two sellers of clothing. There were two public baths and two mosques.

Also at this time, Meymeh was the seat of the deputy governor of the district of Meymeh and Jowsheqan. The deputy governor's main responsibility was to preside over the solhiya court that met in Meymeh and was mostly concerned with financial disputes. Traditional education by the mullahs had already been abolished and replaced with secular, state-run schools. Meymeh and Jowsheqan each had a school, and the two of them together were overseen by a raʾis-e maʿāref, or "head of [the department of] education". Each town also had a kadkhoda, or "head of the village", appointed by the governor of Kashan based on the recommendations of the locals. The kadkhoda's responsibilities were mainly concerned with agriculture, especially cleaning the qanats. By this time, however, use of the qanats in Meymeh had declined—of its ten qanats in Meymeh, only two (the Bir and the Mordabad) were still in use. The kadkhoda had three subordinates, or pakars, and there was also a mirab in charge of water distribution.

Despite the decline of the qanats, Meymeh remained a prosperous town. There was little to no emigration to the growing metropolis of Tehran, especially in contrast to neighboring districts. Meymeh enjoyed a fairly constant water supply and good farmland. It also had vineyards. Surplus crops were stored in an old fort in the town. An important tradition connecting Meymeh with Kashan was the festival of Esbandi, which Lambton observed during her time here, although celebration of Esbandi declined dramatically in the following decades and was moribund by the end of the 1960s.

Administrative history 
During the late Qajar period, Meymeh was part of the district of Jowsheqan. Under the Pahlavi dynasty, in 1921–22, Meymeh was put in Jowsheqan boluk of Kashan shahrestan. By 1950, the boluk had been made a dehestan, and by 1954 it was raised to a bakhsh, now named Meymeh. Then, in 1957, the bakhsh of Meymeh was transferred from Kashan to Isfahan County, which upset the residents of Jowsheqan who had traditionally identified with Kashan more. Thus, the bakhsh was split in two, with Meymeh going into Isfahan and Jowsheqan into Kashan. In 1990, the county of Borkhvar and Meymeh was formed by merging those two districts. The capital of the new county was the new city of Shahin Shahr. Under this new arrangement, Meymeh remained a bakhsh with two rural districts, Zarkan and Vandada.

Despite all these changes, the borders of the town of Meymeh itself have remained essentially unchanged since at least the original Pahlavi setup.

Economy 
The economy of Meymeh is primarily rural and agricultural. Irrigation comes from a seasonal river as well as from qanats, although the use of qanats had declined by the 1930s. Major crops at this time included cereals, beans, cotton, fruits, and vegetables. Cultivation of opium was forbidden in 1937. Surplus crops were stored in an old fort. A unique feature of the Meymeh region is the presence of bumkands, which are manmade caverns used to shelter livestock during the harshest part of winter.

Meymeh has historically been known for its dried fruit, sold in Isfahan and Kashan. They are either sold plain or in jowzeqand form, where the dried fruit skin is stuffed with sugar.

Modern Meymeh also derives economic significance from its position on the Tehran-Isfahan highway. Much of modern Meymeh's service economy is dedicated to stores and restaurants along the main highway.

References

Populated places in Shahin Shahr and Meymeh County
Cities in Isfahan Province